Marc-Andrea Hüsler was the defending champion but lost in the semifinals to Antoine Bellier.

Bellier won the title after defeating Renzo Olivo 6–7(2–7), 6–4, 7–5 in the final.

Seeds

Draw

Finals

Top half

Bottom half

References

External links
Main draw
Qualifying draw

San Luis Open Challenger – 1
2022 Singles